Elysius paranomon is a moth of the family Erebidae that is found in Mexico.

References

Moths described in 1912
paranomon
Moths of Central America